Eschscholzia elegans is a relative of the California poppy that occurs on Guadalupe and Cedros islands, off the coast of the Baja California peninsula.

Although many of the specimens given its name are actually Eschscholzia ramosa, its type specimen and a few other specimens have very different seeds, and may be more closely related to Eschscholzia palmeri.

References

External links
Holotype of Eschscholzia elegans Greene

elegans
Endemic flora of Mexico
Flora of Baja California
Flora of Mexican Pacific Islands
Cedros Island
Natural history of the California chaparral and woodlands